Chandraspalle is a small village in Koilkonda Mandal, Narayanpet constituency, Mahabubnagar district, Telangana in southern India. It is located 26 kilometres towards west from the district headquarters in Mahabubnagar, and is five kilometres from Mandal Koilkonda and 125 kilometres from Hyderabad.

Chandraspalle's pin code is 509371 and postal head office is in Koilkonda. Jamalpur (5 km), Seri Venkatapur (6 km), Ayodhya Nagar (6 km), Kistampally (6 km),  Modipur (7 km) are nearby villages. Chandraspalle is surrounded by Gandeed Mandal towards North, Hanwada Mandal towards East, Maddur Mandal towards west, Kosgi Mandal towards North.

Chandraspalle is close to the cities and towns of Mahabubnagar, Narayanpet, Badepally, and Farooqnagar.

It has a population of more than 2050. It is a religiously diversified small village with Hindu temples. This village is famous for temples of Lord Ananthaswamy, Hanuman, Saraswati and Pochamma. Every year, the Sree Anantha Swamy Jatara is held for the Ugadi festival, Sree Rama Kalyanotsavam is held in the village for Sri Rama Navami in April and special pujas and bhajans for Lord Hanuman on the day of Hanuman Jayanti, which are all organised by the Sri Maruthi Yuvajana Sangam (SMYS). It was started in 2017. Ugadi, Sankranthi, Dussehra, Diwali and Bonalu, are the major festivals celebrated in this village.

Villages in Mahbubnagar district